Giles Antoine (born 24 May 1958) is a Trinidadian cricketer. He played in eleven first-class and five List A matches for Trinidad and Tobago from 1982 to 1986.

See also
 List of Trinidadian representative cricketers

References

External links
 

1958 births
Living people
Trinidad and Tobago cricketers